Omar is a village near the Pech River valley in Konar Province, Afghanistan.

References 

Populated places in Kunar Province
Villages in Afghanistan